Empty Glass is the second solo studio album by English rock musician Pete Townshend, and his first composed of original material, released on 21 April 1980 by Atco Records.

The album deals with issues that Townshend was struggling with at the time, including alcoholism, drug abuse, marital problems and deceased friends, particularly Keith Moon, the Who's former drummer, who died in 1978. Empty Glass also contained the devotional love song, "Let My Love Open the Door", which became a Top 10 hit (#9) in the US, and the modestly successful singles "Rough Boys" (#89) and "A Little Is Enough" (#72).

The album was rated No. 57 on Rolling Stone list of the 100 greatest of the 1980s. A Gibson poll rated it at No. 5 among "the greatest albums released by an artist who was previously in a successful band".

History
In an interview with Murray Lerner on the film The Who: Live at the Isle of Wight, Townshend explained the album's title:

This concept was derived from the work  of the Persian lyric poet Hafez, which Townshend became interested in from his involvement with Meher Baba, an Indian spiritual master who claimed he was an Avatar — God in human form.

The album was written and recorded between 1978 and 1980, when activity with the Who had started to pick up again, and Townshend found himself having to write for both his solo project and his band. As a result, Empty Glass was considered superior to the Who's subsequent studio album Face Dances (1981), with critics calling it a Who album that never was.

The Who's lead vocalist Roger Daltrey later commented that he felt let down by Townshend, and that many of the songs from the album would have worked well for the Who, among them "Rough Boys" and "Empty Glass". Townshend countered by saying that "Rough Boys" was the one song Daltrey would have wanted clarified (in terms of the song's homoerotic subtext) and toned down were he to sing it, thus defeating its message, while "Empty Glass" had been recorded during sessions for Who Are You in 1978; a version featuring Keith Moon on drums and John Entwistle on bass appeared on the 1996 reissue of that album. This version is notable for suicidal undertones in the lyrics that were changed for Empty Glass: the line "Killing each other, then we jump off the ledge" became "Killing each other by driving a wedge".

The album was produced by Chris Thomas, whose credits included Pink Floyd's The Dark Side of the Moon and the Pretenders' debut studio album. "For a long time," Townshend said, "I wanted to work with Todd Rundgren, and I asked him to produce my solo album which he agreed to do. And then I suddenly realised it probably wasn't a good idea because we're so alike in a lot of ways. I would like to work with him. I think he's a better guitar player than me and a better singer but I think what really worried me about the prospect of him producing my solo album was that I'm influenced by him enough as it is. Do you understand? And I like the way I'm influenced by him at the moment."

Writing and recording
Townshend began writing the songs and recording demos for Empty Glass in his 24-track home studio around late 1978, but recording sessions for the album would only begin in November 1979 at Wessex Studios in North London, with producer Chris Thomas at the helm, and Bill Price as the engineer. Additional recording was done at AIR Studios in Oxford Street and Townshend's Eel Pie Studios from then until March 1980. Townshend performed all the guitar and synthesizer parts on the album, and brought in various musicians to lay down additional instrumentation. The album's line-up included Who touring keyboardist John Bundrick on piano and organ, Tony Butler on bass, Simon Phillips, Kenney Jones, Mark Brzezicki, and James Asher on drums, Peter Hope-Evans on harmonica, and Raphael Rudd, who arranged the horn parts on "Rough Boys".

Cover artwork
The sleeve was designed by British-Irish photographer Bob Carlos Clarke. The album's title is an allusion to a poem by the Sufi lyric poet Hafez, and at one point the album had the working title of "Sacred Animal".

The sleeve of the vinyl album (SD 33–100) includes this dedication:
This album is dedicated to my wife Karen."Rough Boys" is dedicated to my children Emma and Minta and to the Sex Pistols.

Critical reception
Billboard described Empty Glass as "impressive album that showcases perhaps above all, Townshend's incredible versatility on guitar with each riveting riff rising to the forefront." The reviewer conclude that "the production, along with Townshend's impeccable timing, delivery and rhythmic sense gives the album an urgent and contemporary flavor, and an indication of what rock'n'roll should be."

In a review of a remastered release for PopMatters, John Bergstrom said that it had "dated poorly" in terms of arrangement and production but "ultimately, Townshend's songwriting makes the best of Empty Glass more than worthwhile."

Track listing

Non-album tracks

Personnel
Credits are adapted from the Empty Glass liner notes.

Musicians
 Pete Townshend – vocals; guitars; synthesizers
 John "Rabbit" Bundrick – "straight" keyboards
 Tony Butler – bass guitar 
 Simon Phillips – drums 
 James Asher – drums 
 Kenney Jones – drums 
 Mark Brzezicki – drums 
 Peter Hope-Evans – harmonica on 

Technical
 Chris Thomas – producer
 Bill Price – engineer
 Steve Nye – additional engineer
 Ted Jensen – mastering engineer
 Raphael Rudd – brass arrangements on "Rough Boys"

Artwork
 Bob Carlos Clarke – sleeve design
 Richard Evans – graphic design

Charts

Weekly charts

Year-end charts

Certifications

References

External links

1980 albums
Pete Townshend albums
New wave albums by English artists
Atco Records albums
Albums produced by Chris Thomas (record producer)